Trepak is one of the character dances from Pyotr Ilyich Tchaikovsky's famous 1892 ballet The Nutcracker. It is based on the traditional Russian and Ukrainian folk dance also called the trepak. In the Ukrainian language the trepak is known as tropak (or tripak).

The piece is also referred to as the Russian dance and is part of the Divertissement in Act II, Tableau III.  The other character dances in this divertissement are: Chocolate (Spanish dance), Coffee (Arabian dance) and Tea (Chinese dance).

Tchaikovsky's Trepak is written in AABA form.

In popular culture
 The Trepak is used in the Disney film Fantasia. In the sequence, flowers take the place of the Cossack dancers, with thistles resembling men in fur hats and orchids as women with bonnets.
 Different short arrangements of the first notes are used as the victory fanfare for the Game Boy version of the Tetris video game.
 The Trepak is used in The Comeback as Valerie Cherish's ringtone.
 The Trepak also remixed during the third stage of Parodius Da!, alongside Trepak is followed by "William Tell Overture".
 The first beat of Trepak is remixed as a part of Tire & Ice theme from Crash Tag Team Racing beside Russian folk song "Kalinka" and "Hungarian Dance No. 5" by Johannes Brahms.

See also
Hopak

References

Compositions by Pyotr Ilyich Tchaikovsky
The Nutcracker